Suillus appendiculatus is a species of bolete fungus in the family Suillaceae. It was first described scientifically in 1896 as a species of Boletinus by American mycologist Charles Horton Peck. Harry D. Thiers and Alexander H. Smith transferred it to the genus Suillus in 1964.

See also
List of North American boletes

References

External links

appendiculatus
Fungi described in 1896
Fungi of North America
Taxa named by Charles Horton Peck